Metallic Spheres is the tenth studio album released by ambient techno group the Orb in October 2010 and features the Pink Floyd guitarist David Gilmour and the Killing Joke bassist Youth. It spent three weeks on the UK charts, reaching number 12.

Production 
The album was produced by Youth and recorded in June, 2009 at "The Dreaming Cave", in Wandsworth. Engineering was done by Tim Bran (of Dreadzone) and David Nock. Mixing was done by Youth, with mix engineering from Bran, Nock and Michael Rendall at "The Study" in 2010. Mastering was done by Andy Baldwin at Metropolis Studios in London. A headphone version was released as the second disc of the deluxe 2-CD edition, with sound design by Mike Brady, recording by Mike Brady, David Nock and Michael Rendall, and mixing by Youth.

Track listing 

 "Metallic Side" (28:42)
 "Metallic Spheres"
 "Hymns to the Sun"
 "Black Graham"
 "Hiding in Plain View"
 "Classified"
 "Spheres Side" (20:12)
 "Es Vedra"
 "Hymns to the Sun (Reprise)"
 "Olympic"
 "Chicago Dub"
 "Bold Knife Trophy"
 "Cult of Youth Ambient Mix (Parts 1 & 2)" (Edit) (5:35) (iTunes-only bonus track)

All tracks written by David Gilmour, Alex Paterson, and Youth, except:
 "Hymns to the Sun" written by Gilmour, Paterson, Youth, and Graham Nash
 "Black Graham" written by Gilmour, Paterson, Youth, and Marcia Mello
 "Hiding in Plain View" written by Gilmour, Paterson, Youth, and Tim Bran

Personnel 
 David Gilmour – guitars, vocals
 Alex Paterson – sound manipulation, keyboards, turntables
 Youth – bass, keyboards, programming
 Tim Bran – keyboards, programming
 Marcia Mello – acoustic guitar (on "Black Graham")
 Dominique Le Vac – backing vocals

References 

The Orb albums
2010 albums
David Gilmour albums
Albums produced by Youth (musician)
Ambient albums by English artists